St. Mullin's Lower is a barony in County Carlow, Republic of Ireland.

Etymology
St. Mullin's Lower barony takes its name from the village of St. Mullin's.

Location

St. Mullin's Lower is found in south County Carlow, east of the River Barrow and west of the Blackstairs Mountains.

St. Mullin's Lower barony is bordered to the north by Idrone East, County Carlow; to the east and south by Bantry, County Wexford; to the southwest by Ida, County Kilkenny; and to the west by Gowran, County Kilkenny.

History
The ancient land of the Ui Drona was cantered here in the 8th century.

List of settlements

Below is a list of settlements in St. Mullin's Lower:
Ballymurphy
Graiguenamanagh (southern part)

References

Baronies of County Carlow